Never Grow Up is a 2015 autobiography by Jackie Chan with Zhu Mo. The book tells of Chan's life story from childhood years at the China Drama Academy, his big breaks in Hong Kong and Hollywood and honorary Academy Award for his lifetime achievement in film, and his life as a husband and father. In December 2018, the book was released in English, translated by Jeremy Tiang, with the title Never Grow Up.

References

External links
Official Site
www.jackiechan.com

2015 non-fiction books
Jackie Chan
Simon & Schuster books